Potassium selenocyanate is the inorganic compound with the formula KSeCN.  It is a hygroscopic white solid that is soluble in water, decomposing in air to red selenium and potassium cyanide.  The compound has been characterized by X-ray crystallography, which confirms that it is a salt.  The C-N and C-Se distances are 112 and 183 pm, respectively consistent with triple and single bonds.

Synthesis and reactions
Potassium selenocyanate is produced by the reaction of molten potassium cyanide with elemental selenium.

Organic selenocyanates are often prepared by treatment of potassium selenocyanate with alkyl halides or aryl diazonium salts.

Potassium selenocyanate serves as a source of Se0, e.g., in its reaction with triphenylphosphine to give triphenylphosphine selenide.

References

Potassium compounds
Selenocyanates